The Venus Theatre is a major American regional theater in Laurel, Maryland. The theater was founded by Deborah Randall in 2001. The theatrical company is currently the largest production company in Maryland focused primarily on the retelling and adaptation of classics. Past productions have won the Maryland Theatrical Association's Best Drama Prize in 2002 and 2005. The current musical director is Alan Scott.

Recent productions include Shakespeare's Measure for Measure and On Thin Ice. The theater's annual "retro-classic" new works series for 2009 featured Chris Wind's Not Such Stuff, Julia Homokay's Homokay's Medea, Vanda's Why'd Ya Make Me Wear This, Joe, and Jacob M. Appel's Helen of Sparta.

References

External links
 Venus Theatre official website

2001 establishments in Maryland
Theatres completed in 2001
Theatres in Maryland
Theatre companies in Maryland
Tourist attractions in Prince George's County, Maryland
Buildings and structures in Laurel, Maryland